Goodenia saccata is a species of flowering plant in the family Goodeniaceae and is endemic to South Australia. It is an erect shrub with toothed, egg-shaped, petiolate, hairy leaves and racemes or thyrses of yellow or off-white flowers.

Description

Taxonomy and naming
Goodenia saccata was first formally described in 1980 by Roger Charles Carolin in the fourth edition of the Flora of South Australia from material collected by August Wilhelm Eichler in the Gammon Ranges in 1956. The specific epithet (saccata) is a Latin word meaning "pouched".

Distribution and habitat
This goodenia grows on stony slopes and in creek beds in the northern Flinders Ranges and ranges of the Lake Torrens basin.

References

saccata
Flora of South Australia
Plants described in 1986
Taxa named by Roger Charles Carolin
Endemic flora of Australia